The Krimmler Ache is a river in the Pinzgau region of the Austrian state of Salzburg, a right tributary of the Salzach at , Wald im Pinzgau.

Its valley (the ) forms the boundary between the Zillertal Alps in the west and the Venediger Group in the east, which belong to the High Tauern.

Rivers of Salzburg (state)
Zillertal Alps
Venediger Group
Rivers of Austria

de:Krimmler Ache